The American International School Dhaka (AISD) is an independent co-educational day school located in Baridhara, Dhaka, Bangladesh, serving students of all nationalities in pre-kindergarten through grade 12.

Enrollment

The student population is approximately 500 students with 150 Bangladeshi students.

References

External links

 American International School Dhaka
 

American international schools in Asia
International schools in Dhaka
Educational institutions established in 1972
1972 establishments in Bangladesh
International Baccalaureate schools in Bangladesh